Nuclear factor of activated T-cells, cytoplasmic 3 is a protein that in humans is encoded by the NFATC3 gene.

Function 

The product of this gene is a member of the nuclear factors of activated T cells DNA-binding transcription complex. This complex consists of at least two components: a preexisting cytosolic component that translocates to the nucleus upon T cell receptor (TCR) stimulation and an inducible nuclear component. Other members of this family participate to form this complex also. The product of this gene plays a role in the regulation of gene expression in T cells and immature thymocytes. Four transcript variants encoding distinct isoforms have been identified for this gene.

See also 
 NFAT

References

Further reading

External links 
 

Transcription factors
Human proteins